The Four-man competition at the IBSF World Championships 2019 was held on March 8 and 9, 2019.

Results
The first two runs were started on March 8 at 17:04 and the final two runs on March 9 at 17:04.

References

Four-man